Rostislav Krimer is a classical pianist and conductor. He is also the artistic director of the Yuri Bashmet International Music Festival, and the chief conductor and artistic director of the East-West Chamber Orchestra.

Early life 

After studying at the Sibelius Academy in Helsinki and at the Musikhochschule in Cologne, he earned his Postgraduate Diploma and was awarded the Diploma of the Royal Academy of Music at the Royal Academy of Music in London. In 2020 became Associate of the Royal Academy of Music.

Concert life 

Krimer's first London performance was a recital in Cadogan Hall in 2006. The Musical Opinion Magazine wrote of the performance: "Rostislav Krimer knocked out his audience at the Cadogan Hall...He is a pianist of note: watch out for him".

He has performed with musicians and groups including Yuri Bashmet and Moscow Soloists, and at venues including the Grand Tchaikovsky Hall in Moscow, the Berliner Philharmonie in Berlin, and the Queen Elizabeth Hall in London. He has played at festivals including the Aix-en-Provence Festival in France, the Beethovenfest in Bonn, the Lockenhaus Chamber Music Festival, and the Ljubljana Summer Festival.

Krimer is the founder and artistic director of the annual Yuri Bashmet International Music Festival, which has been held in Minsk, Belarus, since 2006.

He performed at the 2014 Sochi Winter Olympic Games ‘Stars of the 21st Century’ concert along with Kronberg Academy Festival artists.

In 2015, Krimer became the Chief-Conductor and Artistic Director of the East-West Chamber Orchestra, which is made up of laureates of Tchaikovsky, ARD, Long-Thibaud, concertmasters of best orchestras from the East and West.

He plays concertos and recitals in duo regularly with the pianist Paul Badura-Skoda and the violinist Sergey Krylov.

In 2017 he worked together with legendary composer Krzysztof Penderecki and performed his piano concerto. In 2018 Rostislav Krimer together with Nils Mönkemeyer performed a premiere of new founded piece of Dmitry Shostakovich at the Shostakovich music festival in Gohrisch, Germany.

The serie of Meczyslaw Weinberg 4 Chamber Symphonies released by Naxos gathered great reviews and 5 stars ratings all over the world including BBC Music Magazine, Gramophone, Classics Today, nominated for most prestigious awards such as ICMA and Opus Klassik as well as became CD of the Month by MusicWeb and CD of the Week by Norman Lebrecht.

Awards 
Associate Royal Academy of Music
 Star Ambassador of the 2nd European Games (2019) 
 Laureate of the UNISA International Piano Competition, also Zara Jackson Prize for the best interpretation of F.Chopin
 3 prizes at the F.Chopin International Youth Piano Competition (Szafarnia, Poland, 1996)

Charity projects 

Rostislav Krimer is the Friend of UNICEF and Member of the Board of Friends of UNICEF

In 2013, he performed at a charity recital with Maxim Vengerov in Minsk.

In 2015, Krimer organized a charity event called '15 000 Chances for Life', and performed at the event along with the East-West Chamber Orchestra, the actor Konstantin Khabensky, and the soloists of the Bashmet Music Festival in Minsk. Over 60 thousand US dollars were raised to buy medicine for the Republican Scientific Practical Center for Pediatric Oncology and Hematology in Minsk.

References 

Living people
Belarusian classical pianists
Sibelius Academy alumni
People from Brest, Belarus
21st-century classical pianists
Year of birth missing (living people)